Mniotype satura, the beautiful arches, is a moth of the family Noctuidae. It is found in the Palearctic realm.

Technical description and variation

C. satura Schiff. (= porphyrea Esp.) (32 b). Shorter- and broader-winged than melanodonta [Mniotype melanodonta (Hampson, 1906)] . Forewing dull reddish throughout, more or less hidden by the purplish black suffusion; the upper stigmata, the basal patch, the submarginal area, and the subterminal line all dull reddish; the wedge-shaped marks before the last much shorter and less conspicuous; otherwise as in melanodonta; hindwing dark brownish-fuscous, with cellspot and slight outer line marked; a pale terminal streak at anal angle. Larva reddish brown, darker along dorsum; dorsal line interrupted and obscure; spiracular yellowish green; an obscure subdorsal row of oblique
grey streaks.
The wingspan is 40–50 mm.

Biology
The moth flies from July to October depending on the location.

The larvae feed on various woody plants and deciduous trees.

References

External links
Beautiful Arches at UKmoths
Lepiforum.de
Vlindernet.nl 

Cuculliinae
Palearctic Lepidoptera
Taxa named by Michael Denis
Taxa named by Ignaz Schiffermüller